The Dorset and Somerset Air Ambulance is a registered charity, which uses a helicopter to provide an air ambulance service to the English counties of Dorset and Somerset. The air ambulance came into service in March 2000, following the success of similar schemes, such as Devon Air Ambulance and Cornwall Air Ambulance. The air ambulance headquarters are at Wellington in Somerset, but the helicopter is based at Henstridge Airfield in Somerset.

Aircraft
The service operates an AgustaWestland AW169 helicopter, callsign Helimed 10, which has been in service since June 2017.
It is crewed by one pilot, a paramedic and a critical care doctor and can carry two patients on stretchers. The pilots and maintenance staff are employed by Specialist Aviation Services, the company which leases the helicopter to the air ambulance service. 
The paramedics are employed by South Western Ambulance Service (SWASFT), although a number of these are paid for by the charity, while critical care doctors are seconded from local NHS hospital trusts.

Operations
In the year ending March 2019, the charity was requested by SWASFT to attend 1,118 incidents by helicopter and 276 incidents by road.
In May 2011, the charity flew its 8,000th mission,
and by 2015 had flown a total of 10,700.
Typical incidents for which the assistance of the air ambulance is requested by SWASFT, include road traffic collisions, medical emergencies such as cardiac arrest, and horse riding accidents, due to the remote locations and the severity of injuries involved in such incidents.

Finances
In the year ending March 2022, the charity's income was £10.4million and expenditure was £7.9M, of which it spent £6.9M operating its helicopter and rapid response vehicle.
This money has to be raised largely from charitable donations. The charity is supported by volunteers spread across the two counties who work to raise funds to ensure that this service continues. It also runs a weekly lottery, which accounts for 48% of the charity's income.
In 2021, it also received £181,000 of government grants.

In 2019, the charity's patron, Somerset racing driver Jenson Button, wrote the foreword to Haynes Publishing Group's new publication Air Ambulance Operations Manual.
The book, written in the style of traditional Haynes Manuals, features cutaway diagrams of the charity's AW169 helicopter. The publisher is making a donation of £0.75 from the sale of every copy to benefit air ambulance charities across the United Kingdom.

See also
 Air ambulances in the United Kingdom
 Healthcare in Dorset
 Healthcare in Somerset

References

External links

 
 

Air ambulance services in England
Organisations based in Somerset
2000 establishments in England
Health in Dorset
Health in Somerset